"The Way to Amalthea"  is a science fiction novella by Soviet writers Boris and Arkady Strugatsky, published in 1960 and written in 1959. An English translation, titled "Destination: Amaltheia", was published in a collection of the same name of Russian science fiction writers in 1963 by Foreign Languages Publishing House, Moscow.

Plot summary
A cargo spaceship, propelled by a photon engine with a large reflective mirror ("sail"), visits the Jupiter system to deliver cargo to a staffed science station on Amalthea. Damaged by meteorites, the spaceship falls into Jupiter, but survives the pressure and floats in the dense atmosphere; the crew manage to work around the damaged mirror and start the main engine to escape Jupiter and finally reach Amalthea.

References

External links
Page at Internet Speculative Fiction Database

1959 novels
1959 in the Soviet Union
Amalthea (moon)
Speculative fiction novellas
Soviet science fiction
Noon Universe novels
Fiction set on Jupiter's moons